Orosz is a Hungarian language surname, which means "Russian", derived from the Turkish urus, which in turn derived from the Russian Rusak ("Russian"). Rusak originates from a Scandinavian term for "oarsman" or "rower", referring to early Russians who rowed their ships inland from the Baltic sea. The name may refer to:

Atanáz Orosz (born 1960), Hungarian Greek-Catholic bishop
Corneliu Oros (born 1950), Romanian volleyball player
Csaba Orosz (born 1971), Slovak sprint canoer
Ferenc Orosz (born 1969), Hungarian football player
Helma Orosz (born 1953), German politician
István Orosz (born 1951), Hungarian artist
Joe Oros (1916–2012), American automobile designer
Károly Orosz (born 1945), Hungarian ice hockey player
Márk Orosz (born 1989), Hungarian football player
Pál Orosz (1934–2014), Hungarian football coach
Péter Orosz (born 1981), Hungarian football player
Petro Oros (1917–1953) Ukrainian clandestine Greek-Catholic bishop
Rozalia Oros (born 1964), Romanian fencer
Tom Orosz (born 1959), American football player
Yaroslav Oros (born 1959), Ukrainian writer

See also
Orosháza

References

Hungarian-language surnames
Hungarian words and phrases
Hungarian people of Ukrainian descent
Ethnonymic surnames